Miracle in the Wilderness is a 1991 American adventure film directed by Kevin James Dobson and written by Michael Michaelian and Jim Byrnes. The film stars Kris Kristofferson, Kim Cattrall, John Dennis Johnston, Rino Thunder, David Oliver and Sheldon Peters Wolfchild. The film premiered on TNT on December 9, 1991.

Plot

Cast 
Kris Kristofferson as Jericho Adams
Kim Cattrall as Dora Adams
John Dennis Johnston as Sgt. Sam Webster
Rino Thunder as Chief Washakie
David Oliver as Lt. Reid
Sheldon Peters Wolfchild as Many Horses
Steve Reevis as Grey Eyes
Peter Alan Morris as Asher Adams
Joanelle Romero as Little Deer 
Otakuye Conroy as Mary
Matthew E. Montoya as Joseph
David Bull Plume as Impatient Brave
Volley Reed as Captured Warrior
Johnny Looking Cloud as Chief #1
Patrick N. Augare as Blackfeet Brave
Robbie Dunn as Shoshone Scout #1 
Terry Fredericks as Shoshone Scout #2
Loren Cuny as Shoshone Scout #3

References

External links
 

1991 television films
1991 films
American adventure films
1990s adventure films
TNT Network original films
Films directed by Kevin James Dobson
1990s English-language films
1990s American films